Rikard Nilsson (born 24 May 1983), sometimes spelled as Richard Nilsson, is a Swedish football defender who plays for IK Gauthiod.

Nilsson started his career in Vänersborgs IF, and played for Bodens BK, IF Elfsborg and FC Trollhättan before joining Lyn in January 2009. He made his Norwegian Premier League debut for Lyn on 3 May 2009 against Stabæk.

References

External links
 
 Fotbolltransfers Profile
 
 

1983 births
Living people
Swedish footballers
Bodens BK players
IF Elfsborg players
Lyn Fotball players
Eliteserien players
Swedish expatriate footballers
Expatriate footballers in Norway
Swedish expatriate sportspeople in Norway
FC Trollhättan players
Association football defenders